The decade of the 1600s in archaeology involved some significant events.

Events
 c.1600: The Savile Map of Bath, England is drawn (discovered in 1977 by Anne Campbell Mcinnes).
 1603: In Holland, Frederik de Houtman publishes a grammar and dictionary of Malay and Malagasy, along with a treatise describing the constellations of the southern hemisphere.
 1609: A Dutch VOC ship built in 1601 or 1602, and loaded with 18000 zinc ingots, is wrecked in 1609 off Gabon, West Africa (discovered in 1985, excavated by Michel L'Hour).

Births
 c.1600: Famiano Nardini, Italian archaeologist (d. 1661)
 1602: John Greaves, English mathematician, astronomer and antiquary (d. 1652)
 1602: May 2 - Athanasius Kircher, German scholar (d. 1680)

References

Archaeology by decade
Archaeology